Yanina Iannuzzi (born 22 July 1973) is an Argentine foil fencer. She competed at the 1992 and 1996 Summer Olympics.

References

External links
 

1973 births
Living people
Argentine female foil fencers
Olympic fencers of Argentina
Fencers at the 1992 Summer Olympics
Fencers at the 1996 Summer Olympics
Pan American Games medalists in fencing
Pan American Games bronze medalists for Argentina
Fencers at the 1991 Pan American Games
Fencers at the 1995 Pan American Games
20th-century Argentine women